Anthene otacilia, the Otacilia hairtail or Trimen's ciliate blue, is a butterfly of the family Lycaenidae, found in Africa.

The wingspan is about 22–23 mm in males and 23–24 mm in females.

The flight period is from September to May peaking in November and March.

The larvae feed on Acacia species.

Subspecies
Anthene otacilia otacilia (Democratic Republic of the Congo: North Kivu, Tanzania, Malawi, eastern Zambia, Mozambique, Zimbabwe, northern Namibia, Eswatini, South Africa: Limpopo Province, Mpumalanga, North West Province, Gauteng, KwaZulu-Natal, Eastern Cape Province and Western Cape Province)
Anthene otacilia dulcis (Pagenstecher, 1902) (Ethiopia, Somalia, coast of Kenya)

References

Butterflies described in 1868
Anthene
Butterflies of Africa
Taxa named by Roland Trimen